Rob Cragg (born September 26, 1953) is an American diver. He competed in the men's 3 metre springboard event at the 1976 Summer Olympics.

References

1953 births
Living people
American male divers
Olympic divers of the United States
Divers at the 1976 Summer Olympics
Sportspeople from  Pennsylvania